The Parental Kidnapping Prevention Act (PKPA; is a United States law that establishes national standards for the assertion of child custody jurisdiction. The Act gives preference to the home state in which the child resided within the past six months for the purpose of preventing a child's parent from forum shopping, that is, initiating legal action in a different state for the purpose of obtaining a favorable court ruling. The Act's name represented its sponsors' concern that forum shopping was being used in cases of parental kidnapping in which one parent interferes with the custodial rights of another parent.

The PKPA provides that a state cannot modify the child custody decree of another state without complying with the terms of the PKPA. If a state modifies an earlier child custody order without doing so, states are not required to recognize the later order.

The enactment of the Defense of Marriage Act (DOMA) in 1996 created a conflict in the case of children of a legally married same-sex couple. A state that does not recognize same-sex marriage is required by PKPA to enforce child custody orders originating in a state that does, which DOMA allows states to refuse to recognize.

References

External links
 Parental Kidnapping Prevention Act
 Forum Shopping

United States federal criminal legislation
1980 in American law
Kidnapping in the United States